Nate Holzapfel (born Nathanael Reid Holzapfel, February 5, 1979) is an American entrepreneur most known for his appearance on ABC’s Shark Tank, where he pitched the Mission Belt Co. He has since gone on to pursue a career in consulting and public speaking,.

In February 2015, Holzapfel revealed that he would be featured on a spin-off of Shark Tank, called Beyond the Tank.

In October 2021, Holzapfel was arrested on allegations that he defrauded a woman he had been dating out of nearly $200,000. He tricked her into signing over her house into a company he controlled. The woman is described as having significant health problems and being responsible for taking care of her disabled adult child.

Early life
Nate Holzapfel was born to Richard N. Holzapfel and Jeni Broberg Holzapfel in Provo, Utah. He is the oldest of five children, including his younger brother and business partner, Zachary Holzapfel. When Nate was an infant, his family moved to Irvine, California for his father's schooling, and at age 13 his family moved to the small town of Woodland, Utah.

Career

Mission Belt
Holzapfel founded Mission Belt with the goal of bringing brand recognition to belts. Holzapfel felt that "fashion houses designed and created belts as an afterthought", and sought to change that practice. After moderate initial success, Holzapfel appeared on Shark Tank and was able to negotiate a deal with fashion brand icon Daymond John.

After partnering with John, Mission Belt sales increased by over $1 million within three weeks of the show airing which enabled Holzapfel to expand sales and entrepreneurship past his initial venture. As of early 2017, Mission Belt has brought in $25 million in revenue. Mission Belt has been listed as one of John's top 5 deals on Shark Tank.

Following Holzapfel's arrest in October 2021, Mission Belt issued a statement distancing the company from Nate Holzapfel indicating that Nate had not been associated with the company for more than seven years.

Sales and Management Training 
Holzapfel offered sales training, coaching, and public speaking services through https://www.nateholzapfel.com/. The website is now inactive due to lapsed squarespace payments.

The Nate State of Mind 
In 2015 Holzapfel launched The Nate State of Mind, offering coaching, training, videos, and books about personal branding. The domain TheNateStateofMind.com is no longer registered to Holzapfel.

Controversies

Larry King lawsuit
In 2019 a lawsuit was filed in federal court in California alleging that Holzapfel "used false pretenses to obtain Larry King's participation in a mock interview, then infringed Plaintiffs' common law trademarks and rights of publicity to make it appear that Larry King endorsed Defendants' commercial activities when, in fact, he has not done so."

According to the complaint, King agreed to do the mock interview, conducted in 2013, "as a favor to a family member." The suit goes on to say that King agreed to provide Holzapfel with a copy of the interview, "for the limited and sole purpose of using excerpts from it in a 'sizzle reel' [demonstration video] that Holzapfel could privately submit to a few television producers and others, in the hopes that those producers would hire Holzapfel for a television program. Holzapfel agreed to use the recorded Mock Interview only for that limited purpose."

The complaint adds that it was made to seem that Holzapfel had appeared on "Larry King Now," when in fact he did not. Alleging trademark infringement, unfair competition and other counts, the suit sought unspecified damages.

In March 2019 the Blast reported that King won a default judgment for $250,000 against Holzapfel. Additionally, Holzapfel was ordered to pay $8,600 towards King's legal fees. The judge also ordered Holzapfel to cease using King’s name and likeness and destroy any materials he made featuring King.

Fraud and sexual abuse allegations
In October 2021, Holzapfel was charged with several counts of communication fraud. The Utah County Attorney's Office charging documents alleged that Holzapfel defrauded a woman he had been dating out of nearly $200,000 "by tricking her into signing over her house into a company he controlled. The woman is described as having significant health problems and being responsible for taking care of her disabled adult child."  

KUTV in Salt Lake City also reported that "charging documents alleged, Holzapfel pressured the woman into selling her house and investing in one of his companies, which turned out not to even exist at that time. Holzapfel eventually listed the woman’s house for sale in August 2020 without her knowledge, prosecutors said, and kept most of the profits, giving her only $11,000 from the sale. '[Holzapfel] used these funds to pay for existing personal debts on his motor vehicle, attorney fees, credit cards, and to purchase expensive luxury items like firearms and gun supplies,' prosecutors wrote in the charging documents. Throughout this entire process, prosecutors said, Holzapfel failed to tell the woman he was married and that he was in financial trouble after getting sued and having a judgment entered against him for more than $250,000.". Utah County investigators believe there are other victims of the same scheme and asked them to come forward.

Following news of Holzapfel's arrest, Mission Belt told KUTV he was not associated with the company and did not represent its values.

Investigators say Holzapfel, who is married, met a woman on Tinder in August. In September, Holzapfel "began grooming the victim by telling her that he would help her invest her money so that she could live like a gold girl. (He) then told the victim that he would invest $50,000 from the victim's late husband's life insurance policy into his company Bristol and Beard," according to new charging documents. 

In January 2022 he was charged with defrauding a third victim. 

In March 2022 he was charged in one case with two counts of forcible sexual abuse, a second-degree felony, and in a second case with two counts of theft, a second-degree felony.

In May 2022, Holpzafel was charged with communications fraud, a second-degree felony. According to charging documents, Holzapfel contacted a woman in regard to a business idea she had. Two days later, he told the woman her idea would be a "big hit" and offered to assist her for $4,000, the charges state. Holzapfel then charged the woman's credit cards for a total of $9,000 without her permission.

Holpzafel is currently charged with eight criminal cases. Six counts of communications fraud, three counts of theft by deception, four counts of forcible sexual abuse, theft, being an unlicensed broker, and four counts of lewdness.

Philanthropy 
Mission Belt donates $1 through the Kiva Lender Fund for every belt that's sold, which provides microloans to entrepreneurs mostly in developing countries. In March 2017, Mission Belt reported that the company has lent $1.5 million, or 60,000 micro-loans, to small business owners around the world. Since joining Kiva in 2012, Mission Belt has become one of its largest supporters, lending hope and opportunity through small loans to tens of thousands around the world.

Filmography 
Beyond the Tank (TV Series) 2016
 Episode #2.12 (2016) ... Himself - Mission Belt
Shark Tank (TV Series) 2013 - 2014 Himself - Entrepreneur: The Mission Belt
 Episode #5.29 (2014) ... Himself - Entrepreneur: The Mission Belt (uncredited)
 Episode #5.4 (2013) ... Himself - Entrepreneur: The Mission Belt
 Episode #4.22 (2013) ... Himself - Entrepreneur: The Mission Belt

References

External links
 NateHolzapfel.com

1979 births
Living people
Writers from Provo, Utah